A Whole New Ballgame is an American sitcom that aired on ABC on Monday Night at 8:30PM from January 9, 1995, to March 13, 1995.  It replaced Blue Skies, a sitcom from the same creators, which featured several of the same actors and aired in the same timeslot in the fall.

Premise
The series centered on Brent Sooner, an egotistical baseball player sidelined by the 1994–95 Major League Baseball strike, who became a sportscaster for TV station WPLP in Milwaukee. Also shown were station manager Meg O'Donnell, weatherman Dr. Warner Bakerfield, anchorman Tad Sherman, and sales manager Dwight King.

Cast
Corbin Bernsen as Brett Sooner
Julia Campbell as Meg O'Donnell
Richard Kind as Dwight King
Stephen Tobolowsky as Dr. Warner Bakerfield
John O'Hurley as Tad Sherman

Episodes

References

External links

1995 American television series debuts
1995 American television series endings
American Broadcasting Company original programming
American sports television series
Television news sitcoms
Television shows set in Milwaukee
English-language television shows
1990s American sitcoms
Television series by Universal Television